Archer (Archie) Shepperson was a teacher, principal, and state legislator in Arkansas. He served in the Nineteenth General Assembly in 1873.

In 1871 he was a deputy sheriff. He was described in a newspaper account as being a fine gentleman. He and his wife had at least 4 children. He was appointed to the Hempstead County board of supervisors. He was involved in opening schools for "Colored" children.

References

Members of the Arkansas House of Representatives
People from Hempstead County, Arkansas